The Tipping Point World Tour was a concert tour by English pop rock band Tears for Fears. The tour supported the group's seventh studio album The Tipping Point (2022). The tour began at the Riverbend Music Center in Cincinnati on 20 May 2022, and abruptly concluded at Floors Castle in Kelso, Scotland, on 8 July 2022. The tour was supported by American band Garbage in the United States, and English singer Alison Moyet of Yazoo in the United Kingdom. 

The tour faced numerous cancelled dates starting from 9 July 2022, owing to Tears for Fears member Curt Smith sustaining a rib injury. All remaining dates of the tour were eventually cancelled on 15 July 2022.

Set list 
This set list is from the concert on 2 July 2022 in Warminster. It is not intended to represent all shows from the tour.

 "No Small Thing"
 "The Tipping Point"
 "Everybody Wants to Rule the World"
 "Secret World" (with elements of "Let 'Em In" by Wings)
 "Sowing the Seeds of Love"
 "Long, Long, Long Time"
 "Break the Man"
 "My Demons"
 "Rivers of Mercy"
 "Mad World"
 "Suffer the Children"
 "Woman in Chains"
 "Badman's Song"
 "Pale Shelter"
 "Break It Down Again"
 "Head over Heels" / "Broken"

Encore

  "End of Night"
 "Change"
 "Shout"

Shows

Cancelled shows

Notes

References

2022 concert tours
Concert tours of North America
Concert tours of the United States
Concert tours of the United Kingdom